Natálya Anderle (born June 23, 1986, in Encantado, Rio Grande do Sul) is Miss Brazil 2008, representing her state. She was crowned Miss Brazil Universe 2008 at the Sunday night, April 13 on Citibank Hall, in São Paulo. Natálya was crowned (with piece created by Ricardo Vieira) by Miss Brazil 2007, Natália Guimarães.

Information
The winner of the beauty contest received the biggest prize offered since 1954: R$250,000, one car and a china porcelain watch. Miss Brazil 2008 represented Brazil at the Miss Universe 2008, on July 15, Nha Trang, Vietnam.

Natálya represented Encantado at the contest of her state, and she was crowned Miss Rio Grande do Sul on October 16, 2007. When she was asked of what she intended to do with the money, she said that will invest in her family business; her parents own farms on Rio Grande do Sul and the family owns a large development construction business managed by her brother Lucas Alberto Anderle.

Natálya, worked as steticist and babysitter in Encantado. Her soccer team is Grêmio. She is graduated in Cosmetology and her favourite film is Legends of the fall.

References

External links
 Página oficial do concurso

1986 births
Miss Universe 2008 contestants
Living people
Miss Brazil winners
Brazilian female models
People from Rio Grande do Sul